Begonia acerifolia is a species of plant in the family Begoniaceae. It is native to Ecuador, Peru and Bolivia. Its natural habitats are subtropical or tropical moist montane forests and subtropical or tropical dry shrubland. It is threatened by habitat loss.

References

acerifolia
Flora of Bolivia
Flora of Ecuador
Flora of Peru
Taxonomy articles created by Polbot